Yu Tai, formerly called Choi Yuk Tai, is one of the 18 constituencies in the North District, Hong Kong.

The constituency returns one district councillor to the North District Council, with an election every four years.

Yu Tai constituency has an estimated population of 18,967, loosely covering Cheung Lung Wai Estate, Golf Parkview, Ng Uk Tsuen, Ping Kong, Royal Green, Sheung Shui Disciplined Service Quarters, Sheung Shui Police Married Quarters, Tai Lung, Tai Ping Estate and Venice Garden in Sheung Shui.

Councillors represented

Election results

2010s

References

Sheung Shui
Constituencies of Hong Kong
Constituencies of North District Council
1999 establishments in Hong Kong
Constituencies established in 1999